The following is a list of the 889 footballers who have made at least 500 domestic league appearances in English league football. This includes the appearances and goals of current and former players in the Premier League and English Football League.

Peter Shilton has made the most appearances, and is the only player to have played in over one thousand games. Chris O'Grady made appearances for 17 different clubs, while 49 players made their appearances for only one team. Frank Womack is the only outfield player who failed to score a goal in his appearances, while Arthur Rowley scored 434. Stanley Matthews made his appearances during a career spanning 34 seasons.

List of players

Note: Players in bold are still active players.

Key

See also
List of footballers in England by number of league goals
List of footballers in Scotland by number of league appearances
List of footballers in Scotland by number of league goals

References

England league appearances
Footballers
Footballers
Football records and statistics in England